Kolodiivka is a village in Ivano-Frankivsk Raion (district) of Ivano-Frankivsk Oblast in western Ukraine. It belongs to Ivano-Frankivsk urban hromada, one of the hromadas of Ukraine. The village's population was 571 as of the 2001 Ukrainian census.

The settlement was first founded in the 12th century as Fedkovo; in 1466, the village was renamed to its current name, Kolodiivka.

The village maintains its own local government as the Kolodiivka Village Council, which consists of 16 locally elected deputies.

Until 18 July 2020, Kolodiivka belonged to Tysmenytsia Raion. The raion was abolished in July 2020 as part of the administrative reform of Ukraine, which reduced the number of raions of Ivano-Frankivsk Oblast to six. The area of Tysmenytsia Raion was merged into Ivano-Frankivsk Raion.

References

Villages in Ivano-Frankivsk Raion
Populated places established in the 12th century